The yellow-bellied sunbird-asity (Neodrepanis hypoxantha) is a small species of passerine bird from the asity family. The male has black upper parts with a bluish sheen and yellow underparts, and is sometimes known simply as the yellow-bellied asity. It is found only in montane rainforests of Madagascar where it feeds on nectar that it sips from flowers, defending a good nectar source from other nectar-feeding birds. It is listed by the International Union for Conservation of Nature as "vulnerable" due to the diminution and fragmentation of its forest habitat.

Description
The plumage of male yellow-bellied sunbird-asities is very bright, with clean yellow undersides and dark black upper sides with an iridescent blue sheen; the females are duller. The eye is surrounded by a bright blue wattle which derives its colour, like the rest of the asities, from bundles of collagen. The bill is long and decurved, as it is adapted for nectar feeding.

Behaviour
This species is endemic to montane forest above 1600 m on the island of Madagascar. Yellow-bellied sunbird-asities are active nectar feeders. They will aggressively defend a nectar source from rivals of the same species as well as from sunbirds.

The yellow-bellied sunbird-asity is listed as vulnerable by BirdLife International and the IUCN. It was once considered to be an endangered species, and even possibly extinct; however, this was due to a lack of ornithological surveys in its high-altitude range. Subsequent research has found it to be more abundant than previously suspected, although it is still considered threatened due to habitat loss and fragmentation.

References 

 BirdLife International (2007) Species factsheet: Neodrepanis hypoxantha. Downloaded from http://www.birdlife.org on 16/6/2007
 Hawkins, F. (2003) Family Philepittidae (Asities) pp 94–105 in del Hoyo J., Elliott A. & Christie D.A. (2003) Handbook of the Birds of the World. Volume 8. Broadbills to Tapaculos Lynx Edicions, Barcelona

External links 

 BirdLife Species Factsheet.

yellow-bellied sunbird-asity
yellow-bellied sunbird-asity